Carabus variolosus is a species of black coloured ground beetle in the Carabinae subfamily that can be found in Bulgaria, Czech Republic, Moldova, Poland, Romania, Slovakia, Ukraine, Slovenia, Croatia, Serbia, Montenegro, Bosnia-Herzegovina, Germany and North Macedonia.

References

variolosus
Beetles described in 1787
Beetles of Europe